Kantamal is a Vidhan Sabha constituency of Boudh district, Odisha.

This constituency includes Kantamal block and 10 GPs (Raxa, Manupali, Gochhapada, Baunsuni, Bohira, Talasarada, Mundipadar, Sagada, Gundulia and Ainlapali) of Boudh block.

Elected Members

Two elections  held during 2009 to 2014 for the Kantamal Vidhan Sabha Constituency, elected members from the Kantamal constituency are :

2014: (85): Mahidhar Rana (BJD)
2009: (85): Bhagaban Kanhar (BJD)

2019 Election Result

v

2014 Election Result
In 2014 election, Biju Janata Dal candidate Mahidhar Rana defeated Indian National Congress candidate Harinarayan Pradhan by a margin of 25,366 votes.

2009 Election Result
In 2009 election, Biju Janata Dal candidate Bhagaban Kanhor defeated Indian National Congress candidate Kanhai Charan Danga by a margin of 14,453 votes.

Notes

References

Assembly constituencies of Odisha
Boudh district